Imre Csjef (born 11 February 1960) is a Hungarian boxer. He competed in the men's welterweight event at the 1980 Summer Olympics.

References

1960 births
Living people
Hungarian male boxers
Olympic boxers of Hungary
Boxers at the 1980 Summer Olympics
Martial artists from Budapest
Welterweight boxers
20th-century Hungarian people